Peremoha Stadium is the main city stadium in Kamianske, Ukraine.

References

External links
 The second life for the Dniprodzerzhynsk's Peremoha Stadium (Вторая жизнь для днепродзержинского стадиона «Победа»). stadiums.at.ua. 7 February 2016.
 Free entrance at the Peremoha Stadium in Dniprodzerzhynsk is available again (Бесплатный вход на стадион "Победа" в Днепродзержинске снова открыт). sobytiya.dp.ua. 20 April 2016
 Sukhovoi, I. ''Football at the land of national chiefs (Футбол на родине вождей). Futbolnyi klub Dnepropetrovsk. 30 June 2015.
 Ministry of Youth and Sport will conduct reconstruction of Peremoha Stadium in Kamianske (Министерство молодежи и спорта проведет реконструкцию стадиона "Победа" в Каменском). 5692.com.ua. 18 November 2016.

Football venues in Dnipropetrovsk Oblast
Sport in Kamianske
Sports venues in Dnipropetrovsk Oblast